Kasagh may refer to the following places in Armenia:

 Kasagh (river)
 Kasagh, Aragatsotn
 Kasagh, Kotayk
 Aparan, historically known as Kasagh
 Kasagh Basilica, a 4th-century basilica in Aparan, Armenia

See also
Kasakhi Marzik Stadium, in Ashtarak, Armenia